The Battle of Java (Invasion of Java, Operation J) was a battle of the Pacific theatre of World War II. It occurred on the island of Java from 28 February – 12 March 1942. It involved forces from the Empire of Japan, which invaded on 28 February 1942, and Allied personnel. Allied commanders signed a formal surrender at Japanese headquarters at Bandung on 12 March.

Order of battle

American-British-Dutch-Australian Command (ABDA)
Koninklijk Nederlands Indisch Leger (KNIL Army): Lieutenant-General Hein Ter Poorten
1st KNIL Infantry Division: Major-General Wijbrandus Schilling
2nd KNIL Infantry Division: Major-General Pierre Antoine Cox
3rd KNIL Infantry Division: Major-General Gustav Adolf Ilgen
British troops (ca. 5,500 men): Major-General Sir Hervey Degge Wilmot Sitwell
US troops (ca. 750 men:) Major-General Julian Francis Barnes
Australian troops (ca. 3,000 men): Brigadier Arthur S. Blackburn.

Imperial Japanese Army
16th Army: General Hitoshi Imamura
2nd Division (Maruyama Masao)
 2nd Company and 4th Company of 2nd Tank Regiment (21 Type 97 Medium Tanks)
 2nd Recon Regiment (16 Type 97 Tankettes)
48th Division (Yuitsu Tsuchihashi)
 3rd Company of 4th Tank Regiment (10 Type 95 Light Tanks)
 3rd Company of 2nd Tank Regiment (10 Type 97 Medium Tanks, 5 M3 Light Tanks)
 48th Recon Regiment (16 Type 97 Tankettes)
Sakaguchi Detachment (Shizuo Sakaguchi)
 56th Infantry Group Tankette Unit (8 Type 97 Tankettes)
Shoji Detachment
 1st Company of 4th Tank Regiment (10 Type 95 Light Tanks)
North Sumatra Campaign
 2nd Company of the 4th Tank Regiment (10 Type 95 Light Tanks)

Forces

Japan
The Japanese forces were split into two groups: the Eastern Force, with its headquarters at Jolo Island in the Sulu Archipelago, included the 48th Division and the 56th Regimental Group. The Western Force, based at Cam Ranh Bay, French Indochina included the 2nd Division and the 3rd mixed regiment (detached from the 38th Division).

Allies
The Allied forces were commanded by the Royal Netherlands East Indies Army (KNIL) commander, General Hein ter Poorten. Although the KNIL forces had, on paper, 25,000 (mostly Indonesian) well-armed troops, many were poorly trained. The KNIL forces were deployed in four sub-commands: Batavia (Jakarta) area (two regiments); north central Java (one regiment); south Java (one regiment) and east Java (one regiment).

The British, Australian and United States units were commanded by British Major General H. D. W. Sitwell. The British forces were predominantly anti-aircraft units: the 77th Heavy AA Regiment, 21st Light AA Regiment and 48th Light AA Regiment. The only British armoured unit on Java was B squadron from the British 3rd Hussars, which was equipped with light tanks. Two British AA regiments without guns, the 6th Heavy AA Regt and the 35th Light AA Regiment, were equipped as infantry to defend airfields. The British also had transport and administrative units.

The Australian formation—named "Blackforce" after its commander, Brigadier Arthur Blackburn V.C.—included the Australian 2/3rd Machine Gun Battalion, the Australian 2/2nd Pioneer Battalion, a company from the Royal Australian Engineers, a platoon from the 2/1st Headquarters Guard Battalion, about 100 reinforcements diverted en route to Singapore, a handful of soldiers who had escaped from Singapore following its fall to the Japanese, two transport companies, a casualty clearing station, and a company headquarters unit. Blackburn decided to re-organise his troops as an infantry brigade. They were well equipped in terms of Bren guns, light armoured cars, and trucks, but they had few rifles, sub-machine guns, anti-tank rifles, mortars, grenades, radio equipment or Bren gun carriers. Blackburn managed to assemble an HQ staff and three infantry battalions based on the 2/3rd Machine Gun, the 2/2nd Pioneers, and a mixed "Reserve Group". The only U.S. ground forces in Java, the 2nd Battalion of the 131st Field Artillery (a Texas National Guard unit) was also attached to Black Force.

Japanese landings

The Japanese troops landed at three points on Java on 1 March. The West Java invasion convoy landed on Bantam Bay near Merak and Eretan Wetan. The West Java convoy had previously fought in the Battle of Sunda Strait, a few hours prior to the landings.

Meanwhile, the East Java invasion convoy landed on Kragan after having defeated the ABDA fleet in the Battle of the Java Sea.

West Java campaign

Campaign from Merak and Bantam Bay
After discussing the war preparation on 21 January with the commander of the 3rd Fleet and inspected the 48th Division at Manila, Lieutenant General Hitoshi Imamura received an order to attack Java on 30 January.

The convoy consisted of 56 transport ships with troops aboard from 16th Army Headquarters, 2nd Division and 3rd mixed regiment. The convoy left Cam Ranh Bay at 10:00 on 18 February, and the commander-in-chief Lieutenant General Hitoshi Imamura was aboard on the transport ship Ryujo Maru. The convoy escort was under the command of Rear Admiral Kenzaburo Hara.

At 23:20 on 28 February, the transport ships carrying the Nasu and Fukushima detachments commenced landing operations at Merak. Ten minutes later they were joined by the other transport ships; the one carrying the Sato detachment dropped anchor at Bantam Bay. By 02:00 on 1 March, all ships had reached their designated positions. The KNIL Merak Coastal Detachment, made up of a section from the Captain F.A.M. Harterink's 12th KNIL Infantry Battalion, machine-gunned the landing Japanese but was quickly defeated.

On 1 March, the Japanese set up new headquarters at Serang. The troops of the 2nd Division led by Lieutenant-General Masao Maruyama were divided into the following detachments:
Nasu Detachment: Major-General Yumio Nasu
Fukushima Detachment: Colonel Kyusaku Fukushima
Sato Detachment: Colonel Hanshichi Sato

The Nasu detachment was ordered to capture Buitenzorg to cut the escape route from Batavia to Bandoeng. The Fukushima and Sato Detachments would in the meanwhile head for Batavia through Balaradja and Tangerang.

The Australian 2/2nd Pioneer and 2/3rd Machine Gun Battalions were positioned along a riverbank at Leuwiliang and put up a vigorous defence during the Battle of Leuwiliang. Highly accurate volleys from "D" Battery, U.S. 2/131st Field Artillery, destroyed many Japanese tanks and trucks. Blackforce managed to hold up the Japanese advance for two full days before being forced to withdraw to Soekabumi, lest it become trapped by Japanese flanking manoeuvres, and was ordered to retreat to Soekabumi. Around the same time, the Fukushima and Sato units headed westwards to Madja (Maja) and Balaradja (Balaraja). They found many of the bridges already destroyed by the retreating Dutch and were forced to find other routes; some units took the opportunity to make for Buitenzorg.

On 4 March, Ter Poorten decided to withdraw his forces from Batavia and Buitenzorg to reinforce the defence of Bandoeng. The following evening Dutch troops in Batavia surrendered to the Sato Detachment. By the dawn of 6 March, the Japanese troops had attacked Buitenzorg, which was guarded by the 10th Company, KNIL 2nd Infantry Regiment; 10th Company, 1st Infantry Regiment; Landstorm troops and a howitzer unit. In the morning Buitenzorg was occupied, while a large number of Allied soldiers had retreated to Bandoeng. The Nasu Detachment pursued them through Tjiandjoer and (Tjimahi), entering the city on 9 March. The Shoji Detachment also entered Bandoeng on the same day, arriving from the north, having travelled via Lembang.

Campaign from Eretan Wetan

On 27 February, the unit 3rd mixed Regiment, led by Colonel Toshishige Shoji, separated from the main convoy and landed on 1 March, at Eretan Wetan, near Soebang on the northern coast of West Java. The unit's objectives were to capture the important Kalidjati airfield and weaken the Allied air arm, while the 2nd Division attacked Batavia.

At dawn on 1 March, nine Brewster and three Glenn Martins from the KNIL Air Force, together with 12 Hurricanes from No. 242 Squadron RAF and No. 605 Squadron RAF, carried out attacks on Japanese troops at Eretan Wetan. Using motor vehicles, the Japanese rapidly advanced to Soebang. At noon, the Kalidjati airfield was finally occupied following a tenacious defence carried out by 350 British troops. Meanwhile, other Japanese units led by Major Masaru Egashira bypassed Allied defences and headed for Pamanoekan (Pamanukan), and from then on to Cikampek (Tjikampek), where they were able to cut the road link between Batavia and Kalidjati.

The fall of Kalidjati airfield greatly alarmed the Dutch, who set about planning hasty and ill-prepared counterattacks. On 2 March, a KNIL armoured unit (the Mobiele Eenheid), commanded by Captain G.J. Wulfhorst with approximately 20 tanks, and supported by the 250 men of Major C.G.J. Teerink's 5th KNIL Infantry Battalion, launched a counterattack against the Shoji unit outside Soebang. The attempt initially went well, but in the afternoon the attack was repulsed. Afterwards, the main force of the Japanese 3rd Air Brigade arrived at Kalidjati airfield.

At 10:00 on 8 March, Major-General Jacob J. Pesman, the commander of Stafgroep Bandoeng, met Colonel Toshishige Shoji at the Isola Hotel in Lembang and surrendered.

Japanese order of battle
2nd Division: Lt. Gen. Masao Maruyama
Nasu Detachment: Maj. Gen. Yumio Nasu
16th Infantry Regiment
1st Battalion of 2nd Field Artillery Regiment
1st Company of 2nd Engineer Regiment
Two motor transport companies
Fukushima Detachment: Col. Kyusaku Fukushima
4th Infantry Regiment
2nd Battalion of 2nd Field Artillery Regiment
5th Anti-Tank Battalion
2nd Company of 2nd Engineer Regiment
 Sato Detachment: Col. Hanshichi Sato
29th Infantry Regiment
2nd Tank Regiment
1st Company of 2nd Field Artillery Regiment
2nd Engineer Regiment
Shoji Detachment: Col. Toshishige Shoji
3rd mixed Regiment (formed ad hoc from 230th infantry regiment)
One mountain artillery battalion
One engineer company
One anti-tank battalion
One light tank company
One anti-aircraft battery
Two independent engineer companies
One platoon of the Bridge Material Company
One motor Transport Company
Part of the 40th Anchorage Headquarters
Part of the Airfield Battalion

East Java campaign

Moving eastward
The East Java campaign was composed of the 48th Division from the Philippines. On 8 February, the 48th Division departed from Lingayen Gulf, Luzon Island (Philippines) protected by the 4th Destroyer Squadron. On 22 February, the convoy arrived at Balikpapan and the Sakaguchi Detachment joined the 48th Division aboard the ships.

On 25 February, the convoy left Balikpapan and sailed southward to Java. On 27 February, the ABDA fleet under command of Rear-Admiral Karel Doorman was detected and attacked by the 5th Destroyer Squadron and other units of the 3rd Fleet in the Battle of the Java Sea.

The 3rd (Motorised) Cavalry Squadron of the 1st Dutch KNIL Cavalry Regiment, under the command of Ritmeester C.W. de Iongh, resisted the landing force but was quickly subdued.

Meanwhile, the flying boat Dornier X-28 of the 6th GVT (Groep Vliegtuigen or Aircraft Group) from MLD, B-17 bombers of the U.S. 7th Bomber Group, A-24 dive bombers of the U.S. 27th Bomb Group and Vildebeest torpedo-bombers from the 36th RAF Squadron worked round the clock to harass the invaders.

After landing, the 48th Division was divided into:
Imai Unit (Right Wing): Colonel Hifumi Imai
Abe Unit (Left Wing): Major-General Koichi Abe
Tanaka Unit (Tjepoe Raiding Unit): Colonel Tohru Tanaka
Kitamura Unit (Bodjonegoro Raiding Unit): Lieutenant Colonel Kuro Kitamura

The Tanaka Unit was ordered to occupy Tjepoe (Cepu) to secure the oilfields there and the Kitamura Unit was to occupy Bodjonegoro, near Tjepoe. The whole unit planned a two-pronged attack on Surabaya from the west through Lamongan and from south through Djombang and Modjokerto.

The Tanaka Unit occupied Tjepoe on 2 March, while the Kitamura Unit occupied Bodjonegoro on 3 March. The Japanese proceeded further and overwhelmed the Dutch defences at the Ngawi Regency, Tjaroeban (Caruban), Ngandjoek, Kertosono, Kediri and Djombang.

At Porong, near Surabaya, the Dutch infantry from 8th, 13th Battalion, 3rd Cavalry Unit and the American 131st (Texas) "E" Field Artillery Regiment gave fierce resistance to the incoming Japanese. Eventually, the Allied troops under Major-General Gustav A. Ilgen had to retreat to the island of Madura upon the completion of demolition of the city's infrastructure. On the evening of 9 March, Major-General Ilgen, commander of the KNIL in East Java, signed the instrument of surrender.

Moving southward
The Sakaguchi Detachment from Balikpapan joined the East Java Invasion fleet as well. After landing, they were divided into three units with one battalion each: Kaneuji Unit, Major Kaneuji commanding; Yamamoto Unit: Colonel Yamamoto commanding; and Matsumoto Unit, Lieutenant Colonel Matsumoto commanding; these units moved south with the objective to occupy Tjilatjap in order to capture the harbour and block the retreat to Australia. In one week, they advanced rapidly and overcame all Dutch army defence found in Blora, Soerakarta, Bojolali, Djokjakarta, Magelang, Salatiga, Ambarawa and Poerworedjo. The Kaneuji and Matsumoto Detachments moved through the mainland, captured Keboemen and Purwokerto, north of Tjilatjap on 8 March. The Yamamoto Unit fanned out along the beach and mounted a two-pronged attack, entering Tjilatjap on 8 March. By then, however, the Dutch had withdrawn to Wangon, a small town located between Purwokerto and Tjilatjap. On the following day, Major-General Pierre A. Cox—the Dutch Central Army District commander—surrendered his troops to the Japanese.

Japanese order of battle
48th Division: Major-General Yuitsu Tsuchihashi
Imai Unit (Right Wing): Colonel Hifumi Imai, commander of the 1st Formosan Infantry Regiment
1st Formosan Infantry Regiment
One mountain artillery battalion
One engineer company
Abe Unit (Left Wing): Major-General Koichi Abe
48th Infantry Group Headquarters
47th Infantry Regiment
One mountain artillery battalion
One engineer company
Tanaka Unit (Tjepoe Raiding Unit): Colonel Tohru Tanaka
2nd Formosan Infantry Regiment
One mountain artillery battalion
One engineer company
Kitamura Unit (Bodjonegoro Raiding Unit): Lieutenant Colonel Kuro Kitamura
48th Reconnaissance Regiment

Sakaguchi Detachment: Major-General Shizuo Sakaguchi
Yamamoto Unit: Colonel Yamamoto
1st Battalion of the 124th Infantry Regiment
Kaneuji Unit: Major Kaneuji
2nd Battalion of the 124th Infantry Regiment
Matsumoto Unit: Lieutenant Colonel Matsumoto
3rd Battalion of the 124th Infantry Regiment

Allied surrender

By 7 March, defeat was inevitable, with Tjilatjap already in Japanese hands. Soerabaja was being evacuated while Japanese troops were rapidly converging on Bandoeng from both the north and the west. At 09:00 on 8 March, the Commander-in-Chief of the Allied forces—Ter Poorten—announced the surrender of the Royal Netherlands East Indies Army in Java.

At 23:00, the Dutch radio station NIROM (Nederlandsch Indische Radio Omroep Maatschappij) broadcast the last news from a temporary transmitter at Ciumbuluit. The announcer Bert Garthoff ended the broadcast with the words "Wij sluiten nu. Vaarwel tot betere tijden. Leve de Koningin!" (We are closing now. Farewell till better times. Long live the Queen!)

The Dutch Governor, Jonkheer Dr. A.W.L. Tjarda Van Starkenborgh Stachouwer and Lieutenant-General Ter Poorten, together with Major-General Jacob J. Pesman, the commander of the Bandoeng District, met the Japanese Commander-in-Chief, Lieutenant-General Hitoshi Imamura at Kalidjati that afternoon and agreed to the capitulation of all the troops.

Aftermath
On 3 March, the U.S. Navy gunboat  was sunk south of Java by a Japanese naval squadron consisting of the destroyers Arashi and Nowaki, and the heavy cruiser Maya. Only one member of her crew survived.

On 10 March, Lieutenant-General Hitoshi Imamura became the new governor of Java and Madura, thus becoming the highest authority in the occupied Dutch East Indies. He stayed in this position for approximately eight months, until 11 November 1942. Imamura was subordinated to Field Marshal Count Hisaichi Terauchi, the Supreme Commander of the Southern Army, headquartered in Saigon, French Indochina. He was also the governor of the so-called "Southern Territories" (Malaya, Burma, the Philippines, Hong Kong, Java, Sumatra, and Borneo) and directly subordinated to the Imperial Headquarters in Tokyo, Japan.

On 12 March, the senior British, Australian and American commanders were summoned to Bandoeng where the formal instrument of surrender was signed in the presence of the Japanese commander in the Bandoeng area, Lieutenant-General Masao Maruyama, who promised them the rights of the Geneva Convention for the protection of prisoners of war.

Immediately after this, the widely-spread Japanese troops were reorganised. The 16th Army (2nd Division and 48th Division) was ordered to guard Java, while the eastern territory (Lesser Sunda islands, Celebes, Ambon and Netherlands New Guinea) became the responsibility of the Imperial Navy. The other units were deployed to other combat areas in the Pacific or returned to Japan.

The surrender of the Dutch marked the end of the ABDA defence in the Dutch East Indies and the collapse of the "Malay Barrier" (or "East Indies Barrier"). Because the Allied naval force had been destroyed, the Indian Ocean and the approach to Australia lay open to the Imperial Japanese Navy.

See also
 Lost Battalion (Pacific, World War II)

Notes 

Several city names are dual written because of
different name given by Dutch and by Indonesian now, for example Batavia is now called Jakarta and Buitenzorg is now called Bogor.
different grammatic rule from old van Ophuijsen, Soewandi until the latest "Ejaan Yang Disempurnakan" (The Improved Grammar). tj → c, DJ → j, oe → u, j → y
The documents are rare and accurate casualties among Allied and Japanese combatans are difficult to estimate because of
chaotic situation then, no time to record log or images; the Japanese troops rushed rapidly, only 3 months, the whole Dutch East Indies were seized.
most documents were burnt and destroyed by the Allies to keep secrecy from Japanese occupation.
other available documents and images, which not yet publicised, were mostly written in Dutch and Japanese.

References

Further reading
Anderson, Charles R.. The U.S. Army Campaigns of World War II – East Indies. The U.S. Army Campaigns of World War II.United States Army Center of Military History. CMH Pub 72-22.
W.F.Craven and J.L.Cate Chapter 10: Loss of the Netherlands East Indies

U.S. Navy The Campaigns of the Pacific War – Chapter 3 The Japanese Invasion of the Philippines, the Dutch East Indies, and Southeast Asia

External links

Java 1942
Java 1942
Java (1942)
Java (1942)
Java (1942)
Java (1942)
Java
Java (1942)
1942 in Japan
History of Java
Japanese occupation of the Dutch East Indies
Java 1942
Invasions of the Dutch East Indies
February 1942 events
March 1942 events